The water-kit is a technical design of an alleged "perpetual motion machine" created by Agha Waqar Ahmed, an inventor based in Khairpur, Sindh, Pakistan. In July 2012, Agha Waqar Ahmed's Water-kit was publicly announced as an apparatus that allows water to be used as a source of fuel in cars. The apparatus consists of a "water-kit" that can break water into hydrogen and oxygen molecules through the process of electrolysis of water. Ahmed claims that any car using his kit can run exclusively on water and will yield  of travel on a liter of water.

He has also claimed that his technology can power the entire country with water. His claims have been met with scepticism as well as enthusiasm from Pakistani scientists. Critics have pointed out that in order for the invention to work, it would have to violate the second law of thermodynamics.

Water kit
Ahmed calls his invention "water-kit". The kit consists of a cylindrical jar (which holds the water), electrodes, wires to be attached with car's battery and a hose leading to the engine. The kit claims to use electrolysis to convert water into HHO gas, which is then used as fuel in an otherwise unmodified gasoline engine. The kit states that it requires distilled water. Ahmed claims that he has been able to achieve much higher amounts of HHO compared to any other inventor because of his "undisclosed calculations". He has applied for a patent from the Government of Pakistan and is waiting for their feedback.

Reception
Ahmed claims to have done several demonstrations for Pakistani government officials. According to a television interview he has had three meetings with Government's Science and Technology sector as well as a meeting with Pakistan's Atomic energy commission.
Upon hearing about his invention, the prime minister of Pakistan, Raja Pervaiz Ashraf, formed a committee consisting of three people. The committee members were Khursheed Shah, the minister of religious affairs, Mir Changez Khan Jamali, the federal minister for Science and Technology, and Dr. Asim Hussain, the advisor to the Prime Minister on Petroleum and Natural Resources. Out of the three members, Khursheed Shah has publicly supported Ahmed's invention.

After much publicity and media coverage, many government officials came forward to offer support for Ahmed's invention. Along with the aforementioned federal minister for Religious Affairs, two other federal ministers endorsed his work. Sindh Minister for Law and Prisons, Mohammad Ayaz Soomro, called Ahmed a national hero while speaking to a media group. Three other government officials congratulated him, stating that he "brought a revolution in the world of Science". However, Ahmed has been criticised for not clearly explaining how his invention could work without violating the laws of thermodynamics. Ahmed was invited by Jamil Ahmed Khan, the Pakistani ambassador to UAE, to demonstrate his technology in Abu Dhabi. Abdul Qadeer Khan, a nuclear scientist, has supported the idea of a water-fuelled car; however he has been criticised for his position.
Samar Mubarakmand was supportive of this idea and seemed enthusiastic at first, but when Agha Waqar was called by Pakistan Television Corporation to take the demo of this Water Kit, he failed to give a demonstration in the live program in his car, claiming he had not fit the Water kit in his car for the TV program. Mubarakmand then told him that in his opinion, calcium carbide is added in water to produce the fuel for the engine. In that case, the calcium carbide is the energy source, not the water.

Atta ur Rahman, a scientist and a former minister of Science and Technology, called for a technical investigation of Ahmed's car by top engineering universities when he appeared on Geo TV's Capital Talk. He told the host, Hamid Mir, that such inventions don't work and if they were to work, they would violate the law of conservation of energy. Ahmed replied to this criticism by stating that he had already made long drives with the car, done demonstrations for politicians and media personalities. He even challenged Rahman to check and verify his water fueled car himself. By the end of the show, everyone agreed that the car should be tested by independent sources. Rahman showed similar concerns in another show by Talat Hussain Syed, News Night with Talat, for Dawn News.
While speaking to Express Tribune, Rahman stated he suspected this invention to be a scam. He repeated that such an invention would have to violate the laws of thermodynamics to work.

On 11 August 2012, Rahman reported that the vehicle was to be fully inspected by engineers at the National University of Science & Technology, but Ahmed never showed up for the appointment. This caused Rehman to further accuse Ahmed of fraud, stating "Agha Waqar Ahmad did a disappearing act and never turned up for the appointment. The fraud had been exposed and escape was the only route available to him".

Pervez Hoodbhoy, a nuclear physicist, wrote in The Express Tribune that Ahmed's coverage in the media, along with endorsement by government authorities and scientists, has exposed the ignorance and self-delusion of such entities. He criticized politicians and media for hailing Ahmed as a national hero and for promoting pseudo-scientific theories related to water-fueled cars. He insisted any technology should comply with basic principles of Science before getting any government funding.
Before Agha Waqar Ahmed, another Pakistani known as Doctor Ghulam Sarwar had claimed in December 2011 that he had invented a car that only runs on water.

Several other skeptics have also weighed in on Ahmed's invention, mainly due to its violation of second law of thermodynamics. On 6 August 2012, a physics teacher, Ranomal Malani, challenged Ahmed to demonstrate his kit publicly. If he succeeds, Malani has promised a pay out of five million rupees. Ahmed accepted the challenge.

Talat Hussain, who covered Ahmed's invention on his show, did a follow up show on 3 August 2012 to address the skeptics. His guests consisted of a panel of scientists, a Ph.D student and a reporter for KTN News. Ahmed was notable by his absence. The scientists reiterated the problem of water-kit's incompatibility with the second law of thermodynamics. One of the guests, Javed Ahmed Chatta, said he was present at one of the demonstrations and showed his skepticism; however, his concerns were ignored by the authorities. Another guest, Adeel Ghayur, stated that even if the apparent violation of natural laws was ignored the cost to operate such a car would be impractical.

See also

 Hydrogen production
 Perpetual motion
 Stanley Meyer's water fuel cell
 The Water Engine
 Timeline of hydrogen technologies

References

External links
 The News Pakistan
http://www.brecorder.com/general-news/172/1242718/

Water-fuelled cars
Fraud in Pakistan
Conspiracy theories in Pakistan
2012 controversies
Discovery and invention controversies
Free energy conspiracy theories
Hoaxes in Pakistan